Venceslas Victor Jacquemont (8 August 1801 – 7 December 1832) was a French botanist and geologist known for his travels in India.

Born in Paris on August 8, 1801, Victor Jacquemont was the youngest of four sons of Frédéric François Venceslas Jacquemont de Moreau (1757-1836) and Rose Laisné. He studied medicine and later took an interest in botany. His early travels took him around Europe. He was lightly built and capable of living on a very frugal diet.

After being invited by the Jardin des Plantes to collect plant and animal specimens from a country of his choice for 240 pounds a year, Jacquemont traveled to India leaving Brest in August 1828. He arrived at Calcutta on 5 May 1829. He went to Delhi on 5 March 1830 and went onwards towards the western Himalayas. He visited Amber in Rajputana, met with the Sikh Emperor Ranjit Singh at his capital of Lahore, and visited the kingdom of Ladakh in the Himalaya. He also visited Bardhaman (Burdwan) in Bengal in November 1829. He died of cholera in Bombay on 7 December 1832. 

Several plants are named for him, including Vachellia jacquemontii, the Himalayan White Birch (Betula jacquemontii), the Indian Tree Hazel (Corylus jacquemontii), Afghan Cherry (Prunus jacquemontii), and the cobra lily or Jack in the pulpit (Arisaema jacquemontii). 


Selected publications

References

Bibliography

External links
Victor Jacquemont papers at the American Philosophical Society

19th-century French botanists
1801 births
1832 deaths
National Museum of Natural History (France) people